Neritopsidae is a family of small sea snails and freshwater snails in the clade Cycloneritimorpha (according to the taxonomy of the Gastropoda by Bouchet & Rocroi, 2005).

The great majority of species within this family are only known as fossils. The few species which are extant are sometimes termed "living fossils".

Taxonomy

2005 taxonomy 
This family consists of three following subfamilies (according to the taxonomy of the Gastropoda by Bouchet & Rocroi, 2005):
 Neritopsinae Gray, 1847
 † Naticopsinae Waagen, 1880 - synonym: Hologyridae Kittl, 1899
 † Paffrathiinae Heidelberg, 2001

2007 taxonomy 
Bandel (2007) have established two new subfamilies. But he recognizes Naticopsinae at family level as Naticopsidae with newly created subfamilies in it.

 Neritopsinae Gray, 1847
 † Paffrathiinae Heidelberg, 2001 - to be clarified if Bandel recognized this family. It is not mentioned in his work Bandel (2007).
 † Cassianopsinae Bandel, 2007
 † Colubrellopsinae Bandel, 2007

Genera 
Genera within the family Neritopsidae include:

The only extant genera are Neritopsis and Pluviostilla from subfamily Neritopsinae.

Subfamily Neritopsinae
 Neritopsis Grateloup, 1832
 Pluviostilla Kase & Kano, 1999
Genus † Bandelopsis Frýda, Blodgett & Stanley, 2003
 † Bandelopsis oregonensis
Genus † Byzantia Kosnik, 1997
 † Byzantia obliqua
Genus † Dahmeria
Genus † Devononerita
 † Devononerita brevis
 † Devononerita brevispira
 † Devononerita megalacantha
 † Devononerita typica
Genus † Hungariella
Genus † Neritoptyx
Genus † Nuetzelopsis
 † Nuetzelopsis orchardi
 † Nuetzelopsis tozeri
Genus † Praeturbonitella
 † Praeturbonitella kochi
Genus † Trachydomia
 † Trachydomia newelli
 † Trachydomia nodosa
 † Trachydomia oweni
 † Trachydomia raymondi
 † Trachydomia turbonitella
 † Trachydomia whitei
Genus † Trachyspira
Genus † Turbonitella
 † Turbonitella biserialis
 † Turbonitella fraterna
 † Turbonitella humilis
 † Turbonitella ovoides
 † Turbonitella primula
 † Turbonitella proligera
 † Turbonitella pusilla
 † Turbonitella semisulcatus
 † Turbonitella strialata
 † Turbonitella trunculinoda
 † Turbonitella tuberculata
 † Turbonitella ussheri
Genus † Wallowiella Frýda, Blodgett & Stanley, 2003
 † Wallowiella vallieri
Genus † Weitschatopsis Frýda, Blodgett & Stanley, 2003
 † Weitschatopsis pulchra

Subfamily † Naticopsinae
Genus † Damesia
Genus † Dicosmos
Genus † Frombachia
Genus † Jedria
 † Jedria deckeri
 † Jedria meeki
 † Jedria ventrica

Genus † Naticopsis McCoy, 1844
Genus † Pachyomphalus
Genus † Planospirina
Genus † Pseudoplagiothyra
 † Pseudoplagiothyra praecursor
Genus † Vernelia

subfamily † Cassianopsinae - from Late Triassic
 † Cassianopsis Bandel, 2007 - type genus of the subfamily Cassianopsinae
 Cassianopsis armata (Münster, 1841) - synonym: Naticella armata Münster, 1841 - type species
 Cassianopsis decussata (Münster, 1841) - synonyms: Naticella decussata Münster, 1841; Naticella nodulosa Münster, 1841; Naticella cincta Klipstein, 1843; Neritopsis decussata; Palaeonarica cancellata Kittl, 1892; Palaeonarica hologyriformis Blaschke, 1905
 † Zardiniopsis Bandel, 2007
 Zardiniopsis subornata (Münster, 1841) - synonym: Naticella subornata Münster, 1841 - type species
 † Fossariopsis Laube, 1869
 Fossariopsis rugosocarinata (Klipstein, 1843) - type species

subfamily † Colubrellopsinae
 Colubrellopsis Bandel, 2007 - type genus
 Colubrellopsis acuticostata (Klipstein, 1843) - synonym: Naticella acuticostata Klipstein, 1843 - type species

subfamily ?
 † Bipartopsis Gründel, Keupp & Lang, 2015
 † Hayamia Kase, 1980
 † Hayamiella Kase, 1984

References

External links

 
Taxa named by John Edward Gray